The Windward Islands People's Movement (WIPM) is a political party in Saba, which held all five seats in the Island Council after the 2019 elections and until June 1, 2022, when council member Hemmie Van Xanten resigned from the party while continuing to serve as a councilor. When party member Esmeralda Johnson was elected to a seat on the island council in 2019, she became the youngest person ever to serve on it.

Netherlands Antilles
Until the dissolution of the Netherlands Antilles, the party competed in island council elections and for the single Saba seat in the Estates of the Netherlands Antilles (which it won in the 2002, 2006 and 2010 elections). The party has also participated in the island council elections of Sint Eustatius and Sint Maarten (until its merger with the Sint Maarten Patriotic Movement (S.P.M.)).

When Saba became part of the Netherlands in 2010, the 2007 island council stayed (where the party obtained 4 of the 5 seats) until election under Dutch law in 2011.

Island Council electoral results

References

Political parties in Saba (island)
Political parties in Sint Maarten
Political parties in Sint Eustatius
1970 establishments in the Netherlands Antilles
Political parties established in 1970
Christian Democratic Appeal